Pimelea prostrata, commonly known as Strathmore weed, New Zealand Daphne, and Pinatoro (Māori) is a species of small shrub, of the family Thymelaeaceae.  It is endemic to New Zealand and has small white flowers and blue green leaves.

Description
Pimelea prostrata is a low growing Prostrate shrub. It has blue green leaves and small white flowers. Its stems range from 30 to 60 cm long, depending on the variety.

 Pimelea prostrata subsp. prostrata has 30cm long stems and yellowish-brown branchlets.

Classification 
Pimelea prostrata has five subspecies:

Pimelea prostrata subsp. prostrata, Pimelea prostrata subsp. seismica, Pimelea prostrata subsp. thermalis, Pimelea prostrata subsp. vulcanica  and Pimelea prostrata subsp. Ventosa.

Etymology 
Pimelea is the shortened version of the Greek: Pimeleoides, which means "resembling Pimelea," a genus in the family Thymelaeaceae, prostrata describes the way in which it grows; Prostrate lying flat on the ground.

Toxins 
Like many species of Pimelea, it is poisonous to animals, particularly horses.  It was originally used as a source of the toxin prostratin, which can serve as a tumor-inhibiting agent.

References

prostrata
Flora of New Zealand